Aleksandr Sergeyevich Burakov (born 27 August 1987) is a former Russian professional footballer.

Club career
He made his debut in the Russian Premier League in 2004 for FC Zenit St. Petersburg.

References

External links
 Profile onsoccer.ru

1987 births
Sportspeople from Kaluga
Living people
Russian footballers
Association football midfielders
FC Zenit Saint Petersburg players
FC Fakel Voronezh players
Russian Premier League players
FC Avangard Kursk players
FC Chita players
FC Sportakademklub Moscow players